Joseph Danger is a loa reflecting either Papa Legba or Papa Loco. Either one, he would be their petro form. There is also a strong possibility that he is Loa from Louisiana Voodoo.

Papa Loco is a rada loa syncretized with the Catholic Saint Joseph and is strict with tradition and justice, making Joseph Danger his aggressive petro form. Some have identified Joseph as a petro form of Papa Legba, who is more known as Kalfu.

It is more likely Joseph Danger is Papa Loco's petro form, hence his name being Joseph in relation to St. Joseph.

Voodoo gods